This is a list of Brazilian football transfers for the 2014–15 summer transfer window. Only moves featuring at least one Campeonato Brasileiro Série A or Campeonato Brasileiro Série B club are listed. This list includes transfers which were completed after the end of the winter 2014 transfer window, starting from 14 August 2014, until the end of the 2014–15 summer window.

The Brazilian summer transfer window opened on 1 January 2015 and closed on 31 March 2015, being valid for international transfers. Domestic transfers are free to occur throughout the season. It is worth noting that in Brazil the winter occurs in half of year, while the summer occurs in the New Year.

Transfers
All players and clubs without a flag are Brazilian. The international transfers for Brazilian clubs are only valid as from the window opening, on 1 January.

References

External links
Brazilian football transfers summer 2014–15. Globo Esporte.
Brazilian football transfers summer 2014–15. UOL Esportes.

Transfers
Transfers
2014-15
Brazil